Schulmeister is a German surname meaning "schoolmaster". Notable people include:

 Jan Schulmeister, Czech footballer
 Karl Schulmeister, Austrian spy
 Otto Schulmeister, Austrian journalist
 Rolf Schulmeister, German educator
 Sergio Schulmeister, Argentine footballer
 Stephan Schulmeister, Austrian jurist and economist
 Vojtěch Schulmeister, Czech footballer

German-language surnames
Occupational surnames